Nazreon Hilton Reid (born August 26, 1999) is an American professional basketball player for the Minnesota Timberwolves of the National Basketball Association (NBA). He played college basketball for the LSU Tigers.

High school career
Reid grew up in Asbury Park, New Jersey and attended Roselle Catholic High School. Following his senior season, in which he averaged 14.8 points, 7.7 rebounds and 2.1 blocks per game, Reid was invited to the 2018 McDonald's All-American Boys Game. During the game, he scored 15 points, had 11 rebounds, two assists, and one block while playing for 20 minutes. Reid scored 22 points as Roselle Catholic defeated Don Bosco Prep in the NJSIAA Tournament of Champions. During his high school career he was a member of the Jelly Fam, an internet movement focused around wild finger roll layups. Nicknamed "Big Jelly", he was known for playing like a big and flashy guard. He was the only member of the movement to make it to the NBA.

Recruiting
Reid was a consensus 5-star recruit in high school, being ranked the best power forward in New Jersey and the third best power forward in the United States, as well as the 22nd best player in his class by 247 sports. On September 12, 2017, Reid committed to play college basketball at LSU. Reid later said "What drew me to the school is Coach Wade, (assistant) Coach (Greg) Heiar, all the other coaches.”

College career
Reid made his college debut on November 6, 2018, where he scored 17 points and 6 rebounds in a blowout 94–63 win over Southeastern Louisiana University. Three days later, Reid scored his season-high 29 points, along with 7 rebounds, and shooting 4–6 behind the arc. Throughout his entire freshman season, Reid averaged 13.6 points, 7.2 rebounds, and 0.9 assists. On April 3, 2019, Reid declared for the 2019 NBA draft and hired an agent, foregoing his final three years of college eligibility.

Professional career

Minnesota Timberwolves (2019–present) 
After going undrafted in the 2019 NBA draft, on July 5, 2019, Reid signed with the Minnesota Timberwolves of the National Basketball Association (NBA), on a two-way contract with the Timberwolves' NBA G League affiliate, the Iowa Wolves. Under the terms of that deal, Reid would split time between Minnesota and Iowa. He also played for Minnesota in the 2019 NBA Summer League. On July 17, 2019, Reid signed a multi-year contract with the Timberwolves. He was assigned to the Timberwolves’ NBA G League affiliate, the Iowa Wolves, for opening night of the G League season. Reid made his NBA debut on December 8, 2019, scoring three points in a 125–142 loss to the Los Angeles Lakers. On January 13, 2020, he scored a season-high 20 points in a 104–117 loss to the Oklahoma City Thunder.

On February 6, 2021, Reid scored a career-high 29 points, alongside six rebounds and two steals, in a 118–120 loss to the Oklahoma City Thunder.

On January 2, 2022, Reid scored a season-high 23 points, alongside eleven rebounds, in a 103–108 loss to the Los Angeles Lakers. He was a key reserve on a Timberwolves team that qualified for their first postseason appearance since 2018. Reid made his first playoff appearance during the first round of the playoffs on April 16, recording two rebounds in a 130–117 Game 1 win over the Memphis Grizzlies. The Timberwolves ended up getting eliminated by the Grizzlies in six games.

On December 16, 2022, during his first start of the season, Reid scored a season-high 28 points and grabbed nine rebounds to help Minnesota to a 112–110 win over the Oklahoma City Thunder. On February 1, 2023, he recorded 24 points, 13 rebounds and four assists in a 119–114 overtime win over the Golden State Warriors.

Career statistics

NBA

Regular season

|-
| style="text-align:left;"|
| style="text-align:left;"|Minnesota
| 30 || 11 || 16.5 || .412 || .330 || .698 || 4.1 || 1.2 || .6 || .7 || 9.0
|-
| style="text-align:left;"|
| style="text-align:left;"|Minnesota
| 70 || 15 || 19.2 || .523 || .351 || .693 || 4.6 || 1.0 || .5 || 1.1 || 11.2
|-
| style="text-align:left;"|
| style="text-align:left;"|Minnesota
| 77 || 6 || 15.8 || .489 || .343 || .765 || 3.9 || .9 || .5 || .9 || 8.3
|- class="sortbottom"
| style="text-align:center;" colspan="2"|Career
| 177 || 32 || 17.3 || .490 || .343 || .723 || 4.2 || 1.0 || .5 || 1.0 || 9.5

Playoffs

|-
| style="text-align:left;"|2022
| style="text-align:left;"|Minnesota
| 5 || 0 || 10.8 || .412 || .429 || 1.000 || 2.8 || .0 || .2 || 1.2 || 4.8
|- class="sortbottom"
| style="text-align:center;" colspan="2"|Career
| 5 || 0 || 10.8 || .412 || .429 || 1.000 || 2.8 || .0 || .2 || 1.2 || 4.8

College

|-
| style="text-align:left;"| 2018–19
| style="text-align:left;"| LSU
| 34 || 32 || 27.2 || .468 || .333 || .727 || 7.2 || .9 || .7 || .7 || 13.6

References

External links
LSU Tigers bio
USA Basketball bio

1999 births
Living people
21st-century African-American sportspeople
African-American basketball players
American men's basketball players
Basketball players from New Jersey
Centers (basketball)
Iowa Wolves players
LSU Tigers basketball players
McDonald's High School All-Americans
Minnesota Timberwolves players
People from Asbury Park, New Jersey
Power forwards (basketball)
Roselle Catholic High School alumni
Sportspeople from Monmouth County, New Jersey
Undrafted National Basketball Association players